St Martin of Tours’ Church, Wolverhampton is a Grade II listed parish church in the Church of England in Wolverhampton.

History

The church was built in 1939 by the architect Richard Twentyman. Pevsner describes it as impressively blocky. It was built on the site of an old mine. The foundations of the church were made of reinforced concrete to a depth of 12 ft. It comprises a 2 bay chancel, and 6 bay nave with low aisles.

The statue of St Martin on the tower is by the sculptor Don Potter, who also designed the font and pulpit. The altar rails, door furniture, grilles and windows were by a local firm, James Gibbons Ltd.

References

Church of England church buildings in the West Midlands (county)
Churches completed in 1939
Grade II listed churches in the West Midlands (county)
Richard Twentyman